Daniel Steven Straily (born December 1, 1988) is an American professional baseball pitcher for the Lotte Giants of the Korea Baseball Organization (KBO). The Oakland Athletics selected Straily in the 24th round of the 2009 Major League Baseball Draft, and he made his Major League Baseball (MLB) debut with them in 2012. He has pitched for the Chicago Cubs, Houston Astros, Cincinnati Reds, Miami Marlins, and Baltimore Orioles. He has also played for the Lotte Giants of the KBO League (KBO).

Early life
Straily was born in Redlands, California, to Sarah Jackson (née Beightler) and Steven Straily. He has an older sister, Larissa. The family moved to Pendleton, Oregon, when he was between kindergarten and first grade. Straily started his baseball career playing Little League Baseball and in the Babe Ruth League in Pendleton. He played his first two years of high school baseball for the Pendleton Buckaroos at Pendleton High School.

The family moved again prior to the start of Straily's junior year in high school, this time to Springfield, Oregon. Straily attended Thurston High School in Springfield, and graduated in 2006. Playing for the baseball team, as a senior he was second-team All-Mid-Western League after going 7–3 with a 2.48 ERA in 62 innings with 65 strikeouts.

He began his college career at Western Oregon University, where he played college baseball for the Western Oregon Wolves for one year. He then transferred to Marshall University, where he played for the Marshall Thundering Herd baseball team as a walk-on, and majored in Business Administration.

Professional career

Oakland Athletics
The Oakland Athletics selected Straily in the 24th round, with the 723rd overall selection, of the 2009 Major League Baseball Draft. He began his professional career with the Vancouver Canadians of the Class A-Short Season Northwest League in 2009. In 16 games pitched (11 starts), Straily had a record of 5–3, a 4.12 earned run average (ERA), and 66 strikeouts (7th in the league) in 59 innings. His 5 wins were tied for 6th-most in the league.

In 2010, Straily was promoted to the Kane County Cougars of the Class A Midwest League. There, he posted a 10–7 record, a 4.32 ERA, and 149 strikeouts (2nd in the league, and 2nd in the A's farm system) in 148 innings (tied for 4th in the league) in 28 games pitched (all starts; tied for 2nd in the league). His 13 home runs allowed were tied for 4th in the league, and his 10 wins were tied for 5th in the league, and his 61 walks were 7th.

For 2011, he was promoted to the Stockton Ports of the Class A-Advanced California League. There, Straily went 11–9 with a 3.87 ERA and 154 strikeouts (5th in the league, and 3rd in the A's farm system) in 160.2 innings (4th) in 28 games (26 starts), and was the April 25 California League Player of the Week. His 14 HBP tied for 2nd in the league, and his 11 wins tied for 7th.

To begin 2012, Straily was promoted to the Midland RockHounds of the Class AA Texas League. He posted a 3–4 record, a 3.38 ERA, and 108 strikeouts (6th in the league) in 85.1 innings in 14 starts. He was the May 21 and June 11 Texas League Player of the Week. He received a promotion to Sacramento River Cats of the Class AAA Pacific Coast League (PCL). His success continued in Triple-A, where Straily went 6–3 with a 2.03 ERA (3rd in the league), and 82 strikeouts in 66.2 innings, in 11 starts. He was the July 16 PCL Player of the Week. Through August 2, 2012, Straily led all of professional baseball with 175 strikeouts. He was named a Texas League mid-season and post-season All Star, Baseball America Minor League All Star, and MiLB.com Organization All Star. Overall, he led all of minor league baseball in strikeouts, with 190. On August 2, Straily was called up to join the Athletics' starting rotation. He made his Major League debut August 3, and struck out the first batter he faced, Brett Lawrie, looking. In the major leagues in 2012, he was 2–1 with a 3.89 ERA in 39.1 innings in 7 starts. Baseball America named him the A's sixth-best prospect, and as having the best slider and changeup.

Pre-2013, Baseball Prospectus named him the # 85 prospect in baseball. On April 1, 2013, Straily was named in the Opening Day roster for the Oakland Athletics as a starting pitcher, but made only one start before getting optioned to Sacramento when Bartolo Colón returned from his suspension. In AAA he was 3–1 with a 1.14 ERA with 33 strikeouts in 31.2 innings over 5 starts. He was the May 26 PCL Player of the Week. After filling in once for Brett Anderson on April 29, Straily permanently took Anderson's spot in the rotation when he was placed on the disabled list. Straily finished the season as the fourth starter, and even started Game 4 of the ALDS against the Tigers, giving up 3 runs in 6 innings. In 27 starts on the year in the majors, Straily went 10–8 with 12 quality starts and a 3.96 ERA, striking out 124 in 152.1 innings.

Pitching for the Athletics at the beginning of the 2014 season, he was 1–2 with a 4.93 ERA in 38.1 innings in 7 starts.

Chicago Cubs

On July 4, 2014, Straily was traded to the Chicago Cubs, with top shortstop prospect Addison Russell and outfielder Billy McKinney, for pitchers Jeff Samardzija and Jason Hammel. Straily had been pitching for the A's Class AAA minor league affiliate. Straily reported to the Iowa Cubs of the PCL, but was called up to Chicago on August 16. Straily started for the Cubs that night against the New York Mets, giving up seven runs in five and a third innings and picking up the loss. The next day, he was optioned back to Iowa. In 2014 with the Cubs, he was 0–1 with a 11.85 ERA in 13.2 innings.

Houston Astros
On January 19, 2015, Straily and Luis Valbuena were traded to the Houston Astros for Dexter Fowler. Pitching for AAA Fresno, he was 10–9 record with a 4.77 ERA in 122.2 innings as he struck out 124 batters, leading the Pacific Coast League. Pitching for the Astros in 2015, he was 0–1 with a 5.40 ERA in 16.2 innings.

Cincinnati Reds

On March 28, 2016, the Astros traded Straily to the San Diego Padres for catcher Erik Kratz. On April 1, he was designated for assignment by the Padres and claimed off of waivers by the Cincinnati Reds. He began the 2016 season as a long reliever, but soon entered the Reds' starting rotation. Straily pitched to a 14–8 record and a 3.76 ERA over 191.1 innings for the Reds in 2016, and led the NL in home runs allowed (31), was 2nd in sacrifice hits (11), was 4th in HBP (11), was 5th in walks (73), and was 7th with 7.244 hits/9 IP. On defense, he had a perfect 1.000 fielding percentage.

Miami Marlins
On January 19, 2017, the Reds traded Straily to the Miami Marlins for Luis Castillo, Austin Brice, and Isaiah White. Straily posted a winning record for the second straight season, finishing 10–9 with a 4.26 ERA and a career-high 170 strikeouts in 181.2 innings, and leading the NL with 33 starts, as he was second in the NL with 31 home runs allowed and 6th with 8 sacrifice hits allowed.

On June 19, 2018, Straily was ejected for the first time in his career when he hit Buster Posey with a pitch with warnings in place. On June 21, Straily was suspended for five games with an undisclosed fine for hitting Posey. In 2018 he was 5–6 with a 4.12 ERA in 122.1 innings over 23 starts. He led Major League Baseball pitchers with a .138 batting average against when facing a lineup for the third time.

Straily and the Marlins agreed on a $5 million salary for the 2019 season. However, the Marlins released Straily on March 25, 2019.

Baltimore Orioles
Straily signed with the Baltimore Orioles on April 5, 2019. Straily was designated for assignment on June 20. He had a 9.42 ERA in  innings over 14 games (8 starts) with 22 home runs and 52 earned runs against him before his designation.

Philadelphia Phillies
On July 31, 2019, the Phillies acquired Straily from the Orioles for cash considerations, and assigned him to the AAA Lehigh Valley IronPigs. He elected free agency on October 1.

Lotte Giants
On December 14, 2019, Straily signed a one-year, $800,000 contract with the Lotte Giants of the KBO League. He excelled in his first season, registering a 15–4 record with a 2.50 ERA and a league-leading 205 strikeouts. He became the first KBO pitcher in eight years to reach 200 strikeouts in a season. On December 2, 2020, Straily re-signed with the Giants on a one-year, $1.2MM contract that includes $500K in incentives. He posted a 10–12 record with a 4.07 ERA and 164 strikeouts over 31 starts. Straily was not re-signed for the 2022 season and became a free agent.

Arizona Diamondbacks
On February 4, 2022, Straily signed a minor league contract with the Arizona Diamondbacks, being assigned to their Triple-A affiliate Reno Aces. He was released on August 1, 2022.

Lotte Giants (second stint)
On August 3, 2022, Straily signed with the Lotte Giants of the Korea Baseball Organization. On November 23, 2022, Straily re-signed a one-year $1 million contract for the 2023 season.

Scouting report
He is a four-pitch power pitcher; he walked 3.5 per 9 innings in the major leagues through July 2019. He also has a "swing-and-miss" slider (84 mph), an "early-in-count" curveball (77 mph), and an above-average changeup (85 mph).

Personal life
He married Amanda Jean Miller on December 15, 2012, in Springfield, Oregon.

References

External links

 Marshall Thundering Herd bio

1988 births
Living people
American expatriate baseball players in Canada
American expatriate baseball players in South Korea
Baltimore Orioles players
Baseball players from Oregon
Chicago Cubs players
Cincinnati Reds players
Fresno Grizzlies players
Houston Astros players
Iowa Cubs players
Jacksonville Jumbo Shrimp players
Jupiter Hammerheads players
Kane County Cougars players
Lehigh Valley IronPigs players
Lotte Giants players
Major League Baseball pitchers
Marshall Thundering Herd baseball players
Miami Marlins players
Midland RockHounds players
Norfolk Tides players
Oakland Athletics players
People from Pendleton, Oregon
People from Springfield, Oregon
Sacramento River Cats players
Stockton Ports players
Vancouver Canadians players
Western Oregon Wolves baseball players
St. Cloud River Bats players